Brandon Kenneth Hughes (born December 1, 1995) is an American professional baseball pitcher for the Chicago Cubs of Major League Baseball (MLB). He made his MLB debut in 2022.

Career
Hughes played college baseball at Michigan State University. He was drafted by the Chicago Cubs in the 16th round of the 2017 Major League Baseball draft as an outfielder. The Cubs converted him from an outfielder into a pitcher in 2019.

Hughes was called up to the majors for the first time on May 17, 2022. He made his MLB debut that day. Hughes made five relief appearance for the Cubs, giving up two runs in 7.0 innings pitched while striking out 9 before he was removed from the 40-man roster and returned to Triple-A on May 28. On May 30, Hughes was selected back to the active roster.

References

External links

1995 births
Living people
Sportspeople from Royal Oak, Michigan
Baseball players from Michigan
Major League Baseball pitchers
Chicago Cubs players
Baseball outfielders
Michigan State Spartans baseball players
Eugene Emeralds players
South Bend Cubs players
Arizona League Cubs players
Tennessee Smokies players
Iowa Cubs players